Sir Sidney Kidman (9 May 18572 September 1935), known as Sid Kidman and popularly named "the Cattle King", was an Australian pastoralist and entrepreneur who owned or co-owned large areas of land in Australia in his lifetime.

Early life
Sidney Kidman was born on 9 May 1857 in Adelaide, in the colony of South Australia, the third son of George Kidman (died December 1857), farmer, and his wife Elizabeth Mary, née Nunn. Kidman was educated at private schools in Norwood and left his home near Adelaide at age 13 with only five shillings and a one-eyed horse that he had bought with his savings. He joined a drover and learned quickly. He then worked as a roustabout and bullock-driver at Poolamacca cattle station, and Mount Gipps Station. and later as a drover, stockman and livestock trader. He made money trading whatever was needed, and supplying services (transport, goods, a butcher shop) to new mining towns springing up in outback New South Wales and South Australia, (including Cobar, Kapunda, Burra and eventually Broken Hill). After he and his brothers worked on the same station, they bought their own.

On 30 June 1885, Kidman married Isabel Brown Wright. They had four children.

Enterprise
Kidman saved money and bought a bullock team, opened a butcher's shop and store at the Cobar copper rush, and made good profits. When he was 21 he inherited £400 from his grandfather's estate and used the money to buy and sell horses and cattle. Kidman was in his middle twenties when he acquired a one-fourteenth share in the BHP mine for 10 bullocks worth about £4 each. He sold his share for £150 less £50 commission and was satisfied with the profit. He had mail contracts on a fairly large scale and in 1886 bought Owen Springs station. Gradually he extended his holdings until they reached out into Queensland and New South Wales.

In 1895 Kidman, in partnership with his brother Sackville, acquired Cowarie Station.

In 1896, Kidman bought his first property in Queensland, Annandale Station, situated in the Channel Country and described as ideal fattening country for cattle.

In 1899 he acquired Eringa Station in South Australia, Austral Downs (NT), and Carcoory Station.

Kidman acquired Diamantina Lakes Station in 1908, paying A£25,000 for the station and all its stock. Later in 1908, he bought the  Mount Poole Station in outback New South Wales.

Another large Channel Country property, Durham Downs Station, was bought in 1909. Kidman bought the property along with Tilbaroo, Morney Plains and Durrie Stations in Queensland, Burrawinna on the border and Macumba Station in South Australia as part of his plan of acquiring prime grazing lands along areas that watercourses followed. He borrowed A£50,000 to pay the A£100,000 asking price. Kidman and the company Bovril Australian Estates purchased Carlton Hill Station in the Kimberley region of Western Australia in 1909 along with another two stations, one being Northcote and Victoria River Downs in the Northern Territory, for £200,000. Boorara Station was acquired in 1913. Kidman acquired Yancannia Station in far western New South Wales in 1916, followed by Corona Station, also in the far west of New South Wales, in 1917.

In 1916, Kidman invested in Glenroy Station with the owners at the time, Reginald Spong and Jabez Orchard, forming the Glenroy Pastoral Company. He acquired the Urisino station in 1913 along with Elsinora and Thurloo Downs in outback New South Wales from Goldsbrough Mort & Co. In 1924, Kidman acquired Merty Merty Station in outback South Australia.

By the time World War I broke out, Kidman was a millionaire. He was knighted in the 1921 Birthday Honours for his support of the war effort.

Kidman's entrepreneurial initiatives extended to many other rural industries. Probably his only unsuccessful business venture was the Kidman & Mayoh shipyard, which he established with engineer brothers Arthur and Joseph Mayoh in the Sydney suburb of Putney when the Commonwealth Government called for 24 wooden ships to be built by various companies for the war effort. The company employed hundreds of men to fell and square heavy timber on the north coast of New South Wales. With labour in short supply, "bush carpenters" went from the north coast to work in the shipyard, assisting the skilled shipwrights. However, on cessation of hostilities the government reduced Kidman & Mayoh's contract from six to two. Early in 1920 the Australian trading company, Burns Philp, made an offer to the government to buy the two ships. However, the first ship – reported as "the largest wooden ship ever built in Australia" – was damaged on launching and failed to receive its necessary first-class certification. A saga of litigation followed, and the vessels, one stripped of usable timber, were burned in 1923. Kidman lost many thousands of pounds, but was reported to have said that his biggest regret was that the work of the superb axemen of the north coast forests, with their enthusiasm, craftsmanship and loyalty, all went for nothing.

Kidman retired in 1927.

On 68 separate stations were stocked about 176,000 head of cattle and 215,000 head of sheep. They comprised a vast network from both the Gulf of Carpentaria and the Fitzroy River in Western Australia down into South Australia near the Flinders Ranges and also across New South Wales. He was well served by his vision of drought-proofing his empire through growing and fattening cattle on the remote stations in the north and bringing them down the lines of stations along the great inland river systems to markets in the south, providing good feed and water on the way to sell them in top condition.

Character
Kidman was most at home around the campfire but comfortable with civic leaders. He animated extraordinary loyalty from his employees; working for Kidman was a "sort of badge of pride".

Death
Following a brief illness, Sidney Kidman died at his home at 76 Northgate Street, Millswood (now Unley Park), aged 78, on 2 September 1935. He left most of his £300,000 estate to his family and to charities.

Legacy
Kidman donated his home in Kapunda, which he acquired around 1900 and called Eringa after Eringa Station, to the Education Department in 1921. It was used as the administration building for the Kapunda High School, later heritage-listed, and extensively renovated in 2011–12. The building was gutted by fire on the night of 29 March 2022, with extensive damage to the roof. 

The Adelaide suburb of Kidman Park was named in his honour. The Kidman Way, a rural road in the western region of New South Wales, part of which was historically used by Kidman and his business enterprise as stock routes, carries his name.

S. Kidman & Co is still the largest private landholder in Australia, although on a much smaller scale. The total value of the company was estimated at 360 million. Two Chinese companies, Genius Link Asset Management and Shanghai Pengxin, sought to acquire the company, but the sale was eventually blocked by the Treasurer of Australia, Scott Morrison who cited the national interest clause in the Foreign Investment Act. In 2016, the company was purchased by Hancock Prospecting (67%) and Shanghai CRED (33%).

In 1992, Kidman's Tree of Knowledge, at Glengyle Station, Bedourie, Queensland, was listed on the Queensland Heritage Register. Kidman is believed to have camped under the tree while planning his pastoral empire in Queensland.

In popular culture
In 1936, a biography of Kidman titled The Cattle King, by Ion Idriess, was published; it became a best-seller.

References

External links
 Kidman info at South Australian history
 S. Kidman and Co website

 
 
 Biography of Sydney Kidman associated with ABC TV program Dynasties

1857 births
1935 deaths
Australian Knights Bachelor
Australian pastoralists
Businesspeople from Adelaide
Australian stockmen